Cardinal Gracias High School is a convent school that was founded on 12 June 1961 and is located in eastern Bandra, a suburb of Mumbai, India.

See also 
 List of schools in Mumbai

References 

Christian schools in Maharashtra
Private schools in Mumbai
High schools and secondary schools in Mumbai
Bandra